Lester Allen (November 17, 1891 – November 6, 1949) was a screen, stage, vaudeville, circus actor, and film director. In vaudeville, he appeared in a double act with Nellie Breen and also emceed at the Palace Theatre.

Filmography

References

External links

1891 births
1949 deaths
American male stage actors
American male film actors
American film directors
Jewish American male actors
Burials at Hollywood Forever Cemetery
Male actors from New York (state)
Vaudeville performers
20th-century American male actors
20th-century American Jews